Lists of ambassadors of Brazil include:

List of ambassadors of Brazil to the United Kingdom
List of ambassadors of Brazil to the United States

See also
 List of ambassadors

 
Brazil